List of roads and highways of Java in Indonesia – this list is for the competed, under construction and project road and highway infrastructure of Java in Indonesia.

Map

Toll roads

Greater Jakarta
 Jakarta Inner Ring Road (beltway)
 Jakarta Outer Ring Road (JORR) (beltway)
 JORR W1 (Pantai Indah Kapuk–Kebon Jeruk Toll Road) (finished)
 JORR W2 U (Kebon Jeruk–Ulujami Toll Road) (finished)
 JORR W2 S (Ulujami–Pondok Pinang Toll Road) (finished)
 JORR S (Pondok Pinang–Taman Mini Indonesia Indah Toll Road) (finished)
 JORR E1 (Taman Mini Indonesia Indah–Cikunir Toll Road) (finished)
 JORR E2+E3 (Cikunir–Cakung–Cilincing Toll Road) (finished)
 JORR N (Tanjung Priok Access Toll Road) (finished)
 Jakarta Outer Ring Road 2 (JORR 2) (beltway)
 Kunciran–Serpong Toll Road (finished)
 Cinere-Cimanggis Toll Road (finished)
 Prof. Dr. Ir. Soedijatmo Toll Road (Soekarno–Hatta International Airport Toll Road)
 Jakarta–Serpong Toll Road
 Jakarta–Tangerang Toll Road (finished)
 Jakarta–Cikampek Toll Road (finished)
 Bogor Ring Road (partially finished)
 TMII–Bogor Toll Road (contract)

Outside Jakarta 
 Surabaya/Waru–Juanda International Airport Toll Road
 Surabaya–Madura Bridge (Suramadu Bridge) (opened at 9 June 2009)
 Trans-Java Toll Road (under Construction, some parts are finished) 
 Cilegon–Bojonegara Toll Road (tender preparation)
 Tangerang–Merak Toll Road (finished)
 Jakarta–Tangerang Toll Road (finished)
 Jagorawi Toll Road (finished)
 Ciawi–Sukabumi Toll Road (contract)
 Sukabumi–Ciranjang Toll Road (tender preparation)
 Ciranjang–Padalarang Toll Road (contract)
 Jakarta–Cikampek Toll Road (finished)
 Cikampek–Purwakarta–Padalarang Toll Road (Cipularang Toll Road) (finished)
 Padalarang–Cileunyi Toll Road (Padaleunyi Toll Road) (finished)
 Cileunyi–Sumedang Toll Road (tender preparation)
 Sumedang–Dawuan/Palimanan Toll Road (tender preparation)
 Cikopo–Palimanan Toll Road (Cipali Toll Road) (finished)
 Palimanan–Cirebon–Kanci Toll Road (Palikanci Toll Road) (finished)
 Kanci–Pejagan Toll Road (finished)
 Pejagan–Pemalang Toll Road (finished)
 Pemalang–Batang Toll Road (finished)
 Batang–Semarang Toll Road (finished)
 Semarang Section A,B,C Toll Road (finished)
 Semarang–Demak Toll Road (tender preparation)
 Semarang–Solo Toll Road (finished)
 Solo–Yogyakarta Toll Road (tender preparation)
 Solo–Mantingan–Ngawi Toll Road (finished)
 Ngawi–Kertosono Toll Road (finished)
 Kertosono–Mojokerto Toll Road (finished)
 Mojokerto–Surabaya Toll Road (finished)
 Surabaya–Gresik Toll Road (finished)
 Surabaya–Gempol Toll Road (finished)
 Gempol–Pandaan Toll Road (finished)
 Pandaan–Malang Toll Road (finished)
 Gempol–Pasuruan Toll Road (finished)
 Pasuruan–Probolinggo Toll Road (finished)
 Probolinggo–Banyuwangi Toll Road (tender preparation)
 Jakarta–Surabaya Toll road (finished)
 Yogyakarta Outer Ring Road

Planned 
 Sunda Strait Bridge 
 Jakarta/Antasari–Depok Toll Road (under construction)
 Jakarta Outer Ring Road 2 (JORR 2) (beltway)
 Soekarno–Hatta International Airport–Kunciran Toll Road (under construction)
 Serpong–Cinere Toll Road (under construction)
 Cinere–Cimanggis/Jagorawi Toll Road (under construction)
 Cimanggis–Cibitung Toll Road (under construction)
 Cibitung–Cilincing Toll Road (under construction)
 Bekasi–Cawang–Kampung Melayu Toll Road (Becakayu Toll Road), initial resumption on October 17, 2014, Section-1 11 kilometers Kasablanka–Jaka Sampurna, Section-2 10.4 kilometers Jaka Sampurna–Duren Jaya
 Serpong–Balaraja Toll Road
 Balaraja–Soekarno–Hatta International Airport Toll Road
 Pasir Koja–Soreang Toll Road

Notes

See also
 Transport in Indonesia

Infrastructure in Indonesia
Roads and highways of Java
Transport in Java
Java